Monte Vista High School is located in Monte Vista, Colorado, United States, in the heart of the San Luis Valley.

References

Education in Rio Grande County, Colorado
Public high schools in Colorado
Buildings and structures in Rio Grande County, Colorado